MeleTOP (or MeleTop) is a Malaysian television infotainment talk show and variety show aired weekly on Astro Ria. From its debut in 2012, it was hosted by the same two presenters, female host Neelofa, and male host Nabil Ahmad, until Neelofa left in 2019. It has held the annual Anugerah MeleTOP ERA (MeleTOP ERA Awards) jointly with Malaysian radio station, ERA since 2013.

Program history 

MeleTOP (sometimes stylised MeleTop) is a Malaysian television  infotainment talk show and variety show, aired every Tuesday on Astro Ria.
The name of the show is a play on the Malay word "meletup", meaning "explosive".
MeleTOP first aired in 2012, with host Neelofa and Nabil Ahmad as hosts.
The program usually includes banter between the co-hosts, a comedic parody ("Parodi") segment, and celebrity guests from the Malay-speaking entertainment industry promoting their work.
The program is broadcast live, and was performed before a studio audience until March 2020, when it was recorded in an empty studio due to the COVID-19 pandemic.

In 2016, MeleTOP apologized for airing a video with an actor in blackface. The video was intended to parody Malaysian singer Yuna and African-American singer Usher performing the song "Crush", in Philadelphia, which had drawn criticism in Malaysia for the pair hugging on stage.

Neelofa left the show in December 2019, with an announcement during the programme, surprising the audience and her co-host. Since then her role has been filled by a series of rotating celebrity guest hosts, including Erra Fazira, Shweta Sekhon, Nora Danish, Elly Mazlein and Sherry Al-Hadad.

Hosts

Main hosts
 Nabil Ahmad (2012–present)
 Hawa Rizwana (2022–present)
 Neelofa (2012–2019)

Guest hosts
 Elly Mazlein 
 Wany Hasrita
 Siti Nordiana
 Mimi Lana
 Nabila Razali
 Jaa Suzuran
 Ain Edruce 
 Nora Danish
 Awal Ashaari
 Tya Ariffin
 Mira Filzah
 Farah Nabilah
 Awie
 Erra Fazira
 AC Mizal
 Uyaina Arshad
 Sherry Al-Hadad
 Wawa Zainal
 Jihan Muse
 Cik B 
 Zahirah MacWilson
 Ummi Nazeera
 Siti Nurhaliza
 Johan Raja Lawak
 Danial Zaini
 Aznil Nawawi
 Heliza Helmi
 Fakhrul Radhi
 Hetty Koes Endang
 Amin Idris
 Lisa Surihani
 Phoon Chi Ho
 Tracie Sinidol
 Kashika
 Zizan Razak

MeleTOP ERA Awards 
MeleTOP and Astro Radio-owned Malay radio station ERA jointly hold the annual "Anugerah MeleTOP ERA" (MeleTOP ERA Awards), which awards prizes based on public voting in several categories in music, film, and television entertainment. The awards have been held annually since 2014, with the 2013 awards being held in February 2014.

In 2017, Neelofa, who was one of the hosts of the awards program, won the Top Top Meletop main award for a female celebrity. In 2018, while again hosting the program, she won four awards, for best fashion, television actress, television drama, and Top Top Meletop. Neelofa acknowledged that many Malaysians questioned her winning at the same time she hosted, but said that there was no impropriety since the awards were determined by fans, not by the show.

References 

2010s variety television series
2020s variety television series
2012 Malaysian television series debuts
Astro Ria original programming
Malaysian television talk shows